Brendan John Dowler, OAM is an Australian Paralympian, and coaches wheelchair basketball.

Personal
Dowler is from Wollongong, New South Wales, has three siblings and is married with 2 children. He attended the University of Wollongong, earning a degree in IT. He became paraplegic as a result of a spinal tumour. When not coaching wheelchair basketball, he is an IT Manager. '

In 2008, he was working for Pillar Administration. He was still working with the company in 2017, having been taken over by Mercer Administration Services.

Basketball
Dowler is classified as a 1.0 player. He started playing wheelchair basketball in 1995.

National team
Dowler first represented Australia in 2001 and has had over 100 caps for the team.

Paralympics
Dowler was considered for selection for the 2000 Summer Paralympics but did not make it.

He was part of the silver medal-winning Australia men's national wheelchair basketball team at the 2004 Summer Paralympics. He was part of the gold medal-winning Australia men's national wheelchair basketball team at the 2008 Summer Paralympics, for which he received a Medal of the Order of Australia.

Club basketball
During his club basketball career, Dowler played for and won national titles with both the Wollongong Rollerhawks and the Sydney Razorbacks.

In 2001 and 2003 he was named one of the NWBL's All-Star Five, additionally in 2003 he was also named the NWBL's Low point MVP.

In 2012, 2017 and 2019 Dowler was named the NWBL "Coach of the Year" after his team, The Wollongong Roller Hawks took out the Australian National Wheelchair Basketball League.

Public speaking
Dowler has done public speaking. In November 2008, he and Brett Stibners spoke at the Sydney Business School's annual Town and Gown function.

Recognition
In 1999, Dowler was awarded a University Blue by the University of Wollongong.

In 2004, Dowler and Tristan Knowles were awarded the title of Illawarra Mercury Sports Star of the Year Award.

In 2008, Dowler, Tristan Knowles, Brett Stibners and Troy Sachs were awarded the title of Illawarra Mercury Sports Star of the Year Award.

References

1968 births
Living people
Australian people of Irish descent
Sportsmen from New South Wales
Paralympic gold medalists for Australia
Paralympic silver medalists for Australia
Wheelchair category Paralympic competitors
Wheelchair basketball players at the 2004 Summer Paralympics
Wheelchair basketball players at the 2008 Summer Paralympics
Paralympic wheelchair basketball players of Australia
Recipients of the Medal of the Order of Australia
Medalists at the 2004 Summer Paralympics
Medalists at the 2008 Summer Paralympics
Paralympic medalists in wheelchair basketball